Kasha, Kasza or Kaša may refer to the following people
Given name
 Mrs. Kasha Davis, American drag queen
 Kasha Kelley, American politician
 Kasha Kropinski (born 1991), South African-born film and television actress
 Kasha Nabagesera, Ugandan LGBT rights activist
 Kasha Rae, English musician
 Kasha Rigby, American skier 
 Kasha Terry (born 1983), American basketball player 

Surname
 Abdul-Hamid Musa Kasha, the first governor of East Darfur
 Al Kasha (1937–2020), American songwriter
 Alexander Kasza (1896–1945), Austro-Hungarian World War I flying ace 
 Dániel Kasza (born 1994), Hungarian football player 
 Filip Kaša (born 1994), Czech football player 
 József Kasza (1945–2016), Serbian politician, economist and banker 
 Lawrence Kasha (1933–1990), American theatre producer, director, playwright, and stage manager
 Michael Kasha (1920–2013), American chemist
 Róbert Kasza (born 1986), Hungarian modern pentathlete